Solium Infernum is a turn-based strategy computer game for Microsoft Windows from independent game developer Cryptic Comet, creator of Armageddon Empires, and was released on November 26, 2009.

Gameplay
Players control an archfiend who is trying to secure the throne of Hell, staving off up to five rivals in the process. The game's artificial intelligence makes up the numbers if not enough players are available to control each archfiend. The game features diplomacy as well as military tactics, making it possible to gamble 'prestige' on the outcome of battles, as well as other tactics to raise the player character's standing amongst the archfiends.

Reception
Solium Infernum failed to receive much attention from the mainstream gaming press, with few publications following the game or publishing reviews; however it was met with critical acclaim from independent journalists and gaming blogs. Quintin Smith was highly enthusiastic towards Solium Infernum, writing in Eurogamer that it "kicked my knees out from under me. It's unlike anything I've ever played" and stating in his GameSetWatch column "more than any game I've played in years Solium Infernum nails the sensation of staring at a screen and losing yourself in the cold glory of a difficult decision." Rock, Paper, Shotgun covered the game heavily, dedicating a large series of posts to a turn-by-turn review of the multiplayer mode, with Kieron Gillen calling Solium Infernum "one of 2009’s most intriguing, subtle and just plain best games." PC Gamer gave Solium Infernum 85%.

References

External links
 Official site

Indie video games
Turn-based strategy video games
Windows games
Windows-only games
2009 video games
Play-by-email video games
Video games developed in the United States
Video games set in hell